The All Saints Cathedral School, founded in 1928, is a private Episcopal college preparatory day school located on the island of St. Thomas in the United States Virgin Islands on Commandant Gade, or Garden Street. It serves students from all over the island.

Student body
All Saints Cathedral School enrolls nearly 300 boys and girls in Junior Kindergarten through Grade 12, divided fairly evenly between boys and girls. The ethnic makeup is highly diverse. The number of students at each grade level is normally between 30 and 40; each grade is divided into A and B sections. The enrollment is stable since there is no room for expansion of the physical facilities. Students walk to school or come by car.
The school year begins in early September and ends in early June. Classes are held five days a week from 8:15 A.M. to 3:10 P.M., and the School is insistent on punctuality at all grade levels. Ninety-five percent of the graduates go on to higher education, and over the years, several students have qualified as Presidential Scholars and National Merit Finalists.

Student activities
Students from All Saints Cathedral School acquit themselves well in a variety of interscholastic competitions. All Saints teams have been champions in Virgin Islands Territorial Quiz Bowl and Science Bowl. In 2003, All Saints ninth graders won the first ever Virgin Islands History, Geography, Civics and Juvenile Rights Bowl. They have also been leaders in the Moot Court competition for some time. All Saints students also compete in Virgin Island competitions such as Carnival King and Queen and Starfest. Younger students also compete in the Spelling Bee, Geography Bee, Math Counts and the JV Quiz Bowl. Other organized activities include Student Council, National Honor Society, French and Spanish Clubs, Interact, and varsity and junior varsity cheerleaders. School teams compete in tackle football, flag football, baseball, soccer, boys' and girls' volleyball they are involved in basketball, and girls' softball. Parents are welcome to attend student performances and are encouraged to join in School activities through the Parent Teacher Student Association.

Campus
The school is located on Commandant Gade where the Cathedral Church of All Saints stands boldly in the midst of the academic buildings. The facilities are compact and fully utilized. A cafeteria provides hot lunches; students may also bring their lunches from home.

Academic program and courses
The school year begins in early September and ends in early June. Classes are held five days a week from 8:15 A.M. to 3:10 P.M. The courses offered in the high school include:

Mathematics:
Pre-Algebra,
Algebra I & II,
Pre-Calculus,
Geometry,
College Algebra,
AP Calculus

English & Grammar:
English 9 through 12 (includes Honors courses),
AP English,
Grammar 9,
Writing Tech I & II

History:
Caribbean History,
U.S. History,
World History,
AP World History,
Modern History

Sciences:
Physical Science,
Physics,
Chemistry,
Biology,
Advanced Biology,
Human Physiology

Languages:
French I - IV,
Spanish I - IV

Electives:
Music (Theory & History),
Art History,
Gym & Health,
Computer Science I & II,
Desktop Publishing,
Multimedia,
Graphic Arts,
Philosophy,
Psychology,
Speech,
Government,
Economics,
Speech

Notable people

 Marcella Nunez-Smith, (class of 1992), C.N.H Long Professor of medicine and epidemiology at the Yale School of Medicine
 Tiphanie Yanique (class of 1996), Pushcart Prize-winning author, poet
 Tobias S. Buckell (class of 1996), NYT Bestselling author

School uniforms
Students are required to wear school uniforms consisting of a white shirt/blouse, and forest green trousers (for males only) and a green plaid or solid forest green skirt. Students are allowed to only wear all brown or all black shoes. Seniors are to wear green ties or green plaid ties (females only).

Schools in the United States Virgin Islands
Episcopal schools in the United States
Educational institutions established in 1928
1928 establishments in the United States Virgin Islands
Saint Thomas, U.S. Virgin Islands